Huvaa Kohfa Bunan is Maldivian romantic comedy drama web series written and directed by Yoosuf Shafeeu. The series stars Ali Azim, Abdullah Shafiu Ibrahim, Ahmed Easa, Mariyam Shifa, Nathasha Jaleel, Washiya Mohamed and Irufana Ibrahim in pivotal roles. The pilot episode of the first season of the series was released on 27 December 2020.

Plot

Season 1
Maaish (Ali Azim) and Dhaain (Abdullah Shafiu Ibrahim) are two cunning and manipulative friends who con others for their own benefits. When they are forcefully evicted by their tenant for evading rent for fifteen months, the two compete for residency at Jamsheed's (Ahmed Saeed) place. Once their traits were exposed, they later manipulate Jamsheed, the die-hard fan of local film actress, Nashidha (Nashidha Mohamed), posing as friends of her. The duo were initially attracted to the short-tempered woman, Haifa (Mariyam Shifa), the girlfriend of an aspiring politician, Naushad (Ahmed Easa). As Naushad and Haifa's relationship ends citing their difference of opinions, Maaish and Dhaain challenge to win the love of Naushad's young sister, Zara (Washiya Mohamed), mostly due to her prosperity and wealth. Meanwhile, Zara's abusive boyfriend, Javid (Mohamed Faisal) is revealed to be a mole working for Naushad's rival, Arushad (Ali Usam) who is competing for the same seat at People's Majlis.

Cast and characters
 Ahmed Saeed as Jamsheed "Jaanu"
 Nashidha Mohamed as Nashidha
 Ali Azim as Maaish
 Ahmed Easa as Naushad
 Mohamed Faisal as Javid
 Abdullah Shafiu Ibrahim as Dhaain
 Mariyam Shifa as Haifa
 Washiya Mohamed as Zara
 Ahmed Azmeel as Assad
 Irufana Ibrahim as Airin
 Rashad Mohamed as Razzaq
 Ali Usam as Arushad
 Aminath Noora as Reesha
 Ibrahim Jihad as Ajuvadh
 Nathasha Jaleel as Shaaira
 Musthafa Hakeem as Juman
 Ali Yooshau as Nuzair

Development
The series was announced in mid-2020. Filming for the series took place in Hulhumale' in July 2020. It was developed as a three-season project, each consisting of 26 episodes. Post production of the series was initiated in late August 2020, scheduling to release the first episode in September 2020.

Soundtrack

Release and reception
The trailer of the series was released on 11 October 2020. The series was made available for streaming through Baiskoafu on 27 December 2020. The pilot episode of the series was met with positive response from critics, where Ahmed Rasheed from MuniAvas highlighted the comical elements included in the series.

References

Serial drama television series
Maldivian television shows
Maldivian web series